Gettysburg may refer to:

Events
 Gettysburg Campaign, a series of American Civil War military engagements in the Main Eastern Theater.
 Battle of Gettysburg, July 1–3 military engagements during the 1863 Gettysburg Campaign
 Retreat from Gettysburg, the Confederate and Union armies' return to the South following the Battle of Gettysburg
 Gettysburg Address, President Abraham Lincoln's speech at the November 19, 1863, Consecration of the National Cemetery at Gettysburg.

Places
 Pennsylvania-related articles
Gettysburg, Pennsylvania
 Gettysburg Battlefield Historic District,  of historic properties, buildings, and structures in Adams County, Pennsylvania
 Gettysburg National Military Park,  protected by the National Park Service
 Gettysburg Museum and Visitor Center, the National Park Service's reception center
 Gettysburg National Cemetery, a district of the military park on Cemetery Hill
 Gettysburg National Museum, the 1921 museum used as the 1974-2008 NPS visitor center and the corporation which owned it before 1974
 Gettysburg National Tower, the former hyperboloid tower seized under the Takings Clause
 Gettysburg Battlefield, the area of Civil War military engagements partially within the military park
 Gettysburg Armory, a vacant borough facility on the National Register of Historic Places
 Gettysburg College, a liberal arts college mostly within the borough
 Gettysburg Railroad Station, a defunct railway station of which only the depot building survives, which houses a railway museum
 Gettysburg Theological Seminary, the original name for the Lutheran Theological Seminary at Gettysburg
 Gettysburg Area School District, a region of Adams County, Pennsylvania, with a high school north of the borough
 Gettysburg Regional Airport, a general aviation airport in Adams County, Pennsylvania, west of the borough
 York-Hanover-Gettysburg, PA Combined Statistical Area, a combined statistical area in York and Adams counties
 Gettysburg, PA USA, a United States Metropolitan Statistical Area that is the Adams County portion of the York-Hanover-Gettysburg CSA

Elsewhere
 Gettysburg, Ohio, a village
 Gettysburg, Preble County, Ohio, an unincorporated community
 Gettysburg, South Dakota
Gettysburg Air Force Station, a General Surveillance Radar Station in South Dakota during the Cold War
 Gettysburg, Washington
 Gettysburg Township, Graham County, Kansas
 Gettysburg Seamount, the highest peak of the Gorringe Ridge, a seamount in the Atlantic Ocean

Entertainment

 Gettysburg: A Novel of the Civil War, an alternate history novel by Newt Gingrich and William R. Forstchen
 Gettysburg Cyclorama or The Battle of Gettysburg, an 1883 painting by Paul Philippoteaux
 Gettysburg (1993 film), a film based on the novel The Killer Angels
 Gettysburg (2011 film), a History Channel television movie
 "Gettysburg" (The Office), a television episode
 "Gettysburg" (The Outer Limits), a television episode
 Sid Meier's Gettysburg!, a computer game
 Gettysburg (block wargame), from Columbia Games
 Gettysburg (game), a board game
 Gettysburg (1863), a trilogy of songs by Iced Earth from The Glorious Burden, 2004
 "Gettysburg", a song by Ratatat from Classics, 2006

Other
Gettysburg Battlefield Memorial Association, a former preservation organization for the battlefield in Gettysburg, Pennsylvania
Gettysburg Electric Railway, the 1893-1916 Gettysburg Battlefield trolley
Gettysburg Railroad, the first of several Gettysburg-named steamtrain lines servicing Gettysburg, Pennsylvania, prior to the Western Maryland and Reading railroads
Forest City and Gettysburg Railroad, formerly servicing Gettysburg, South Dakota
The Gettysburg Championship, a former women's golf tournament in Adams County, Pennsylvania
The Gettysburg Times, an Adams County, Pennsylvania, newspaper
, a Scottish ship supplying the Confederate States of America until captured by the Union Navy and renamed in 1864.
, a Ticonderoga-class guided-missile cruiser